The 2011 IFA shield was held in Kolkata starting from 11 March, with a total of 10 teams including a Chinese super league team participating. Teams were divided into 2 groups and played each other with the top 2 advancing to the semifinals. This was the 115th edition of the tournament.

Participating teams
Group A: East Bengal, Mohammedan SC, Southern Samity, Churchill Brothers SC, Shandong Luneng.

Group B: Mohan Bagan, Chirag United, Aryan FC, Shillong Lajong FC, Pune FC.

Venue

East Bengal 3 – 1 Shandong Luneng (Yuva Bharati Krirangan)

East Bengal 1 – 2  Southern Samity (Yuva Bharati Krirangan)

Shandong Luneng 0 – 1  Southern Samity (Yuva Bharati Krirangan)

Mohammedan SC 1 – 3 Churchill Brothers (Yuva Bharati Krirangan)

Mohammedan SC 1 – 0  Shandong Luneng (Yuva Bharati Krirangan)

East Bengal 1 – 1  Mohammedan SC (Yuva Bharati Krirangan)

Churchill Brothers  0 – 2 Shandong Luneng (Yuva Bharati Krirangan)

Mohammedan SC  1 – 1 Southern Samity(Yuva Bharati Krirangan)

East Bengal 0 – 1  Churchill Brothers (Yuva Bharati Krirangan)

Churchill Brothers 1 – 0  Southern Samity (Yuva Bharati Krirangan)

Aryan Club 1 – 1  Shillong Lajong FC (Yuva Bharati Krirangan)

Mohan Bagan 1 – 1  Shillong Lajong FC (Yuva Bharati Krirangan)

Chirag United 0 – 1 Pune FC (Yuva Bharati Krirangan)

Mohan Bagan 1 – 0  Aryan Club (Yuva Bharati Krirangan)

Chirag United 1 – 2  Shillong Lajong FC (Yuva Bharati Krirangan)

Chirag United  3 – 0 Aryan (Yuva Bharati Krirangan)

Mohan Bagan  2 – 0 Pune FC(Yuva Bharati Krirangan)

Aryan Club 0 – 1  Pune FC (Yuva Bharati Krirangan)

Mohan Bagan 1 – 1  Chirag United (Yuva Bharati Krirangan)

Pune FC 1 – 2 Shillong Lajong FC (Yuva Bharati Krirangan)

Semi-final

28 March 2011 :: Mohan Bagan 2 -1 Southern Samity (YBK – 14.00 IST)

28 March 2011 ::Churchill Brothers 2 – 0 Shillong Lajong FC(YBK – 16.30 IST)

3rd-place game

31 March 2011 :: Southern Samity 4 – 0 Shillong Lajong FC(YBK – 14.00 IST)

Final
31 March 2011 :: Mohan Bagan 1 – 2 Churchill Brothers (YBK – 16.30 IST)

Goal scorers
 3 goals
Racy
 2 goals
Edmílson
Ashim Biswas
Mi Haolun
 1 goal
Thoiba Singh 
Ravinder Singh
Subhash Singh
Swoumi PT
Christopher
Cheng Yuan

References

IFA
IFA Shield seasons